Manijeh Kazemi  (born 15 June 1974) is an Iranian sport shooter. She competed at the 2000 Summer Olympics in Sydney, in the women's 10 metre air pistol.

References

1974 births
Living people
Iranian female sport shooters
Olympic shooters of Iran
Shooters at the 2000 Summer Olympics
Shooters at the 1998 Asian Games
Asian Games competitors for Iran
20th-century Iranian women